Mougoutsi  is a department of Nyanga Province in southern Gabon. The capital lies at Tchibanga. It had a population of 31,789 in 2013.

Towns and villages

References

Nyanga Province
Departments of Gabon